The Georgia national football team represents the nation of Georgia in international association football. It is fielded by the Georgian Football Federation, the governing body of football in Georgia, and competes as a member of the Union of European Football Associations (UEFA), which encompasses the countries of Europe. The team played its first official international match on 27 May 1990 against Lithuania.

Since its first competitive match, more than 200 players have made at least one international appearance for the team. As hundreds of players have played for the team since it started officially registering its players in 1990, only players with 10 or more official caps are included. Georgi Nemsadze became the first Georgian international to reach 10 caps, doing so on 26 June 1994 in a 3–1 win against Latvia. Midfielder Levan Kobiashvili holds the record for most caps, appearing in 100 of official games for Georgia between 1996 and 2011. Defender Zurab Khizanishvili had the longest national team career with Georgia, making his 92 appearances over 16-year period between 1999 and 2015. The goalscoring record is held by forward Shota Arveladze, scoring 26 times in 61 matches between 1992 and 2007, including two hat-tricks.

Key
{|
|style="background:#ff9; border:solid 1px darkgray; text-align:center;" width="32px"|§
|rowspan=5 width="5px"|
|Still active for the national team
|-
!style="border:solid 1px darkgray;"|GK
|Goalkeeper
|-
!style="border:solid 1px darkgray;"|DF
|Defender
|-
!style="border:solid 1px darkgray;"|MF
|Midfielder
|-
!style="border:solid 1px darkgray;"|FW
|Forward
|}

Players
Appearances and goals are composed of UEFA Nations League, UEFA European Championship qualification, FIFA World Cup qualification, Cyprus International Tournament, Malta International Tournament and international friendly matches. Players are listed by number of caps, then number of goals scored. If number of caps and goals are equal, the players are then listed alphabetically. Statistics correct as of match played on 15 November 2019.

Notes

References

External links
 Profile at National-Football-Teams.com
 List of players at eu-football.info

 
Association football player non-biographical articles